Manchester Diocesan Council for Education v Commercial and General Investments Ltd [1969] 3 All ER 1593 is a case in English contract law relating to agreement. The court held that the method of acceptance prescribed for a tender was not mandatory and if an offeror wishes it to be mandatory this needs to be made explicit. This case shows a type of acceptance whereby the method of communication of acceptance is prescribed.

References

1969 in case law
English agreement case law
1969 in British law